Edward Elias Atwater (May 28, 1816 – December 2, 1887) was an American minister and author.

Atwater, only surviving child of Elihu and Julia (Thompson) Atwater, was born in New Haven, Conn., May 28, 1816.

He graduated from Yale College in 1836.  After graduation he taught for a year in a family in Oldham County, Kentucky. In 1837 he entered the Yale Divinity School, and completed a three-year course of study.

On November 24, 1841, he was ordained pastor of the Congregational Church in Ravenna, Ohio, which office he resigned on July 1, 1849. He then spent a year in foreign travel, and on February 3, 1852, was installed over the Congregational Church in Salmon Falls, in the township of Rollinsford, N. H. He was dismissed from this charge, November 3, 1857, when he returned to New Haven. A few months later he undertook a missionary enterprise in the eastern part of the city, which resulted after years of patient labor in the organization of a church (the Davenport Church) of which he was installed pastor on April 22, 1863.

He withdrew from this service on June 14, 1870, but continued to reside in New Haven, partly engaged in literary labors, until his death. In 1887 he went to Florida for the winter, and died there, in the town of Hawthorn, very suddenly, from a stroke of apoplexy, on the 2nd of December, in his 72nd year.

He married, August 9, 1844, Rebecca H., daughter of Deacon David Dana, of Pomfret, Vermont, who survived him. Their only child died in infancy.

He published in 1873 A genealogical register of the descendants in the male line of David Atwater, one of the original planters of New Haven, Conn., to the sixth generation. (64 pp 8vo), also in 1875 a History and Significance of the Sacred Tabernacle of the Hebrews (448 pp 8vo), and in 1881 a History of the Colony of New Haven (611 pp 8vo) The last named elaborate work determined the more serious undertaking which occupied three or four years of his later life,—the editing of a History of the City of New Haven, which was published in 1887 (702 pp. 8vo), and to which he was himself the chief contributor.

External links

 Books by Atwater
 

1816 births
1887 deaths
Religious leaders from New Haven, Connecticut
Yale Divinity School alumni
American Congregationalist ministers
American male non-fiction writers
American religious writers
American genealogists
Writers from New Haven, Connecticut
Yale College alumni
19th-century American clergy
Historians from Connecticut